Syed Azhar Ali (Urdu: سید اظہر علی, born 2 February 1968) is a Pakistani-born former cricketer who played for the Oman national cricket team. He bowled right-arm off break. He captained Oman in the 2005 ICC Trophy.

References

External links
 
 

1968 births
Living people
Cricketers from Karachi
Omani cricketers
Pakistani emigrants to Oman
Pakistani expatriates in Oman